Nalbro Isadorah Bartley (November 10, 1888 – September 7, 1952), was an American short story writer, newspaper columnist and lecturer. Her serialized stories began appearing in popular magazines of the day while she was still in her early twenties.

Background
Bartley was born in Buffalo, New York in 1888. Her father was William Bartley who worked as an entertainer and her mother was Zayda Erndt. She had an older sibling. She was married three times. Her first two marriages to William Horace Lerch and Charles Leonard Shaw ended in divorce. Her third husband, Martin Lee Clark stayed with her until her death in 1952. She had one child by her second husband.

Works

 Paradise Auction, 1917
 The Bargain True, 1918
 The Vanity Pool, 1918
 A Woman's Woman, 1919
 The Bramble Bush, 1919
 The Gorgeous Girl, 1920 †
 The Gray Angels, 1920 †
 Miss Antique, 1920 
 Fair to Middling, 1921
 Head Over Heels, 1922
 Up and Coming, 1923
 Judd & Judd, 1924
 Bread and Jam, 1925
 Her Mother's Daughter, 1926 ††
 The Dear Little Thing, 1926
 Morning Thunder, 1927
 The Mediocrat, 1928
 The Godfather, 1929
 The Fox Woman, 1929
 The Immediate Family, 1930
 The Premeditated Virgin, 1931
 The Devil's Lottery, 1931
 The Amateur Wife, 1932
 Pease Porridge Hot, 1934
 Breathless, 1934

† Available at Project Gutenberg
†† Available at Faded Page

Sources: WorldCat, Open Library, IMDb.

Screen adaptations
Some of her novels and stories were adapted to the movie screen. Up to seven of these were released between 1918 and 1932 including Head Over Heels and The Amateur Wife.

References

External links
 
 
 

1888 births
1952 deaths
20th-century American women writers
20th-century American writers
American women novelists
Novelists from New York (state)
Writers from Buffalo, New York